The 2021–22 B.League season was the sixth season of the Japanese B.League.

B1

Regular season 

East District

West District

B1 Individual statistic leaders

B2

Regular season 

East District

West District

B2 Individual statistic leaders

References 

2021–22 in Asian basketball leagues
B.League
B.League seasons